Thomas Lockwood, Archdeacon of Kells, was appointed Dean of Christ Church, Dublin in December 1543  holding the post under four monarchs until his death in April 1565.

References

Archdeacons of Kells
Deans of Christ Church Cathedral, Dublin
16th-century Irish Anglican priests
1565 deaths